Cyanothamnus inflexus is a plant in the citrus family Rutaceae and is endemic to tablelands near the New South Wales - Queensland border in Australia. It is an erect, woody shrub with pinnate leaves and up to seven white to pink four-petalled flowers in the leaf axils. Boronia bipinnata is similar but has larger, bipinnate or tripinnate leaves and smaller sepals and petals.

Description
The eight stamens are hairy and the stigma is about the same width as the style.

Taxonomy and naming
This species was first formally described in 2003 by Marco F. Duretto and the description was published in the journal Muelleria from a specimen collected in the Girraween National Park. In a 2013 paper in the journal Taxon, Marco Duretto and others changed the name to Cyanothamnus inflexus on the basis of cladistic analysis. The specific epithet (inflexus) is a Latin word referring to the edges of the sepals, near their tip.

In the same 2003 paper, Duretto described four new subspecies. The names have subsequently been changed to reflect the change in the genus name:

Distribution and habitat
Cyanothamnus inflexus grows in heath, woodland and forest on granite and in soils derived from granite. Subspecies inflexus occurs between Stanthorpe and the Girraween National Park and disjunctly in the Gibraltar Range National Park and subspecies on a small hill near Applethorpe north of Stanthorpe. Subspecies grandiflorus occurs near Amiens and Lyra and subspecies torringtonensis is restricted to the Torrington area in New South Wales.

Conservation
Cyanothamnus inflexus subsp. montiazureus (as Boronia inflexa subsp. montiazura is classed as "least concern" under the Queensland Government Nature Conservation Act 1992.

References 

inflexus
Flora of New South Wales
Flora of Queensland
Plants described in 2003
Taxa named by Marco Duretto